Təzəkənd (Azerbaijani for "New village") is a village in the municipality of Gölyeri in the Yardymli Rayon of Azerbaijan.

References

Populated places in Yardimli District